Happy Times is a 2000 tragicomedy film directed by Chinese filmmaker Zhang Yimou, starring Zhao Benshan and Dong Jie. It is based loosely on the short story, Shifu: You'll Do Anything for a Laugh by Mo Yan; the story appears in English translation in the collection of the same title translated by Howard Goldblatt. Though the story and the film share a common opening, they begin to diverge almost immediately.

Plot

In the city of Dalian, an old and laid-off factory worker (played by Zhao Benshan) seeks to marry an obese and divorced middle-aged woman (Dong Lifan), who he hopes will bring him warmth and comfort in life. So he sets out desperately to find a way to make money for the posh wedding he has promised. The hapless man and his friend (Fu Biao) decide to renovate a broken bus on top of a hill that is popular for romantic couples. He turns this bus into a small dwelling he names "Happy Times Hotel," which he will rent to willing couples visiting the hill.

As he brags about his newly opened "hotel" and how much money he is making, he finds himself entrusted with the care of the woman's emaciated, blind stepdaughter Wu Ying (Dong Jie), who is unwanted in the house. Not willing to expose his scheme and ruin his attempt to get married, the man enlists the help of his retired co-workers, who agree to do all they can to make the lonely girl happy at her new job as a masseuse in the "hotel."

As the story unfolds, a touching friendship between the childless man and the dejected, orphaned girl under his care develops, leading to a moving and surprising conclusion.

Although the film was criticized as sentimental, it has a sharp eye for the absurdities generated both by China's socialist past, and by the encroaching capitalism. The two endings, one for the domestic audience and the other for the international audience, suggest a bleak future for those left behind in China's rush to power and wealth.

Cast
 Zhao Benshan
 Dong Jie
 Fu Biao
 Li Xuejian
 Niu Ben
 Tao Hong (cameo)
 Sun Honglei (cameo)
 Fan Wei (cameo)

Reception 
Rotten Tomatoes, a review aggregator, reports that 72% of 60 surveyed critics gave the film a positive review; the average rating is 6.5/10.  The site's consensus reads: "One of Zhang's smaller films, Happy Times is nevertheless moving and bittersweet."  Derek Elley of Variety called it "a modern-day character comedy with a touching edge", comparing it to 1960s European character comedies.  In The New York Times, A. O. Scott described it as "a wise, gentle and sad new comedy" whose sentimentality "reverberates discreetly underneath a rough, matter-of-fact surface".

See also
 Cinema of China

References

External links
 Official site from Sony Pictures Classics
  Official site from Fox Japan
 
 
 
 Happy Times - Film location map in Dalian 

2000 films
Chinese comedy-drama films
2000s Mandarin-language films
Films set in Liaoning
Films about blind people
Films directed by Zhang Yimou
Chinese New Year films
2000 comedy-drama films
2000s Chinese films